HMS Suffolk was a 74-gun third-rate ship of the line of the Royal Navy, launched on 22 February 1765 at Rotherhithe. She was designed by William Bateley, based on the principles of his earlier , and was the only ship built to her draught.

Service history
Suffolk under command of Rear Admiral Joshua Rowley saw action off Guadeloupe island on the night of 21–22 December 1779 when three French frigates, La Fortunée (42 guns), La Blanche (36 guns), and L'Ellis (28 guns) were captured.

On 4 May 1794 Captain Peter Rainier, with Suffolk, a 64-gun ship, and four or five frigates, undertook to escort a convoy to India. In November they arrived at Madras.

On 16 February 1796 Rear-admiral Peter Rainier arrived with a squadron, including Suffolk, off Amboyna, on the Dutch controlled Molucca islands and landed troops who were able to take possession without facing any resistance. Then on 7 March, the squadron arrived off Banda-Neira and again landed troops, this time taking possession after facing only a little resistance. Estimates suggest that each of the captains in Rainier's squadron received £15,000 in prize money.

What is perhaps more interesting and of greater long-term significance is that on this voyage, Suffolk was taking part in an experiment under the auspices of the Sick and Hurt Board. At the suggestion of Rear Admiral Gardner, and in defiance of civilian medical opinion the Admiralty implemented a long-term trial of citrus fruit as a remedy for scurvy. Lemon juice was issued on board Suffolk on her twenty-three-week, non-stop voyage to India. The daily ration of two-thirds of an ounce mixed in grog contained just about the minimum daily intake of 10 mg vitamin C. There was no serious outbreak of scurvy. The following year the Admiralty adopted a general issue of lemon juice to the whole fleet.

At Colombo a serious mutiny broke out on Suffolk on 15 January 1798. However, it was suppressed.

Fate
Suffolk was broken up in 1803.

Notes

References

 Lavery, Brian (2003) The Ship of the Line - Volume 1: The development of the battlefleet 1650-1850. Conway Maritime Press. .

External links
 

Ships of the line of the Royal Navy
1765 ships